Otsa is a village in Võru Parish, Võru County, in southeastern Estonia. It has a population of 137 (as of 2011) and an area of 8.8 km².

Otsa has a station on currently inactive Valga–Pechory railway.

References

Võru Parish
Villages in Võru County